28S ribosomal protein S12, mitochondrial is a protein that in humans is encoded by the MRPS12 gene.

Mammalian mitochondrial ribosomal proteins are encoded by nuclear genes and help in protein synthesis within the mitochondrion. Mitochondrial ribosomes (mitoribosomes) consist of a small 28S subunit and a large 39S subunit. They have an estimated 75% protein to rRNA composition compared to prokaryotic ribosomes, where this ratio is reversed. Another difference between mammalian mitoribosomes and prokaryotic ribosomes is that the latter contain a 5S rRNA. Among different species, the proteins comprising the mitoribosome differ greatly in sequence, and sometimes in biochemical properties, which prevents easy recognition by sequence homology. This gene encodes a 28S subunit protein that belongs to the ribosomal protein S12P family. The encoded protein is a key component of the ribosomal small subunit and controls the decoding fidelity and susceptibility to aminoglycoside antibiotics. The gene for mitochondrial seryl-tRNA synthetase is located upstream and adjacent to this gene, and both genes are possible candidates for the autosomal dominant deafness gene (DFNA4). Splice variants that differ in the 5' UTR have been found for this gene; all three variants encode the same protein.

References

Further reading

Ribosomal proteins